Daniil Sergeyevich Kolesnikov (born 23 May 2000) is a Russian football player.

Club career
He made his debut in the Russian Football National League for FC Akron Tolyatti on 1 November 2020 in a game against FC Tekstilshchik Ivanovo.

References

External links
 
 Profile by Russian Football National League

2000 births
People from Klintsy
Sportspeople from Bryansk Oblast
Living people
Russian footballers
Association football goalkeepers
FC Akron Tolyatti players
Russian First League players
Russian Second League players